"If You Want to Be My Woman" is a song written and recorded by American country music artist Merle Haggard backed by The Strangers. It was released in December 1989 as the third single from his album 5:01 Blues. The song peaked at number 23 on the Billboard Hot Country Singles & Tracks chart and reached number 15 on the RPM Country Tracks chart in Canada.

The song was Haggard's last top-40 country hit; like most classic country artists, Haggard's chart career was severely damaged by changes in the country industry that hit in the early 1990s. It was co-produced by Mark Yeary, keyboardist of The Strangers.

Personnel
Merle Haggard– vocals, guitar

The Strangers:
Norm Hamlet – pedal steel guitar
Clint Strong – guitar
Bobby Wayne – guitar
Mark Yeary – hammond organ, piano, electric piano
Jimmy Belkin – fiddle, strings
Biff Adams – drums
Don Markham – saxophone, trumpet
Gary Church – cornet, trombone

Chart performance

References

1989 singles
Merle Haggard songs
Epic Records singles
Songs written by Merle Haggard
1989 songs